Guerreros is a 2002 Spanish war film directed by Daniel Calparsoro which stars Eloy Azorín and Eduardo Noriega.

Plot 
The plot follows a group of Spanish soldiers and their French allies stationed in the border between Kosovo and the rest of Serbia during a KFOR humanitarian deployment. The young and inexperienced soldiers become embroiled in the conflict that surrounds them and struggle to survive.

Cast

Release 
The film was theatrically released in Spain on 22 March 2002, amid an "aggressive" marketing campaign. However, the film's subpar performance at the box office eventually earned it a reputation as a domestic commercial blunder of the year together with The Shanghai Spell.

Awards and nominations 

|-
| align = "center" rowspan = "3" | 2003 ||  rowspan = "3" | 17th Goya Awards || Best Production Supervision || Javier Arsuaga ||  || rowspan = "3" |  
|-
| Best Original Song || Carlos Jean, Najwa Nimri || 
|-
| Best Special Effects || Aurelio Sánchez-Herrera, Emilio Ruiz del Río, Reyes Abades || 
|}

See also 
 List of Spanish films of 2002

References

External links
 
 DVD Times review
 CINEstrenos review 

Films shot in Madrid
Spanish war films
2002 films
2000s Spanish-language films
Yugoslav Wars films
Works about the Kosovo War
Films directed by Daniel Calparsoro
2000s Spanish films